Umade Bhattiyani (d. 1562; other names Umadeo, Uma Devi) was the wife of Maldeo Rathore, the renowned Rathore ruler of Marwar (r. 1532 – 1562). She earned the epithet of Roothi Rani — the Irate or Aggrieved Queen, or 'the Queen-who-Sulked' due to her strained relationship with her husband.

Family
Umade was a princess of the Bhati Rajput clan of Jaisalmer and was the daughter of Rawal Lunkaran Bhati, the ruler of Jaisalmer (r. 1530 - 1551).

Marriage
Maldeo Rathore was expanding his territories westward and besieged Jaisalmer in 1537. Rawal Lunkaran was forced to sue for peace by giving Maldeo his daughter Umade in marriage to him. The marriage was not a happy one. Lunkaran had sent some davris (maidservants) with his daughter. One of them was called Bharmali who was apparently very beautiful. Maldeo was greatly attracted by her beauty and on the first night of his marriage he delayed visiting Umade because he stayed too long with her maid, Bharmali. Umade felt insulted and decided not to speak to her husband throughout her life. She also refused to have any conjugal relations with him. Her attitude towards Maldeo earned her the title Roothi Rani (displeased or unhappy queen). Umade decided to leave her husband's main palace in Jodhpur and after living in Ajmer for a while, relocated to her step-son's residence in Mewar, a mere year after her marriage in 1537. Umade never returned to Jodhpur during Maldeo's lifetime.

Death
When Umade came to know of Maldeo's death in 1562, she immolated herself at Kelva in Mewar. She did so because while Maldeo had been alive she had the status of Rani of Marwar. After her husband's death, her status changed. She also felt that Maldeo's successor, Chandrasen Rathore, who was the son of another wife of Maldeo, would not accord her the respect due to her, as she had supported the cause of another son of Maldeo instead of Chandrasen. Neither did Umade expect to receive good treatment at the hands of the other wives who had played an important role in creating further differences between her husband Maldeo and her. So, instead of facing possible humiliation, she chose to immolate herself.

In popular culture
Umade is the titular character of the novella Roothi Rani written by Premchand.
A fictionalized Umade was portrayed by Mreenal Deshraj in Sony TV's historical drama Bharat Ka Veer Putra – Maharana Pratap.

Of note
There is similar story about another Roothi Rani in Jaisamand area! The Hawa mahal near Dhebar Lake or Jaisamand Lake here is also known as Roothi Rani ka mahal.

References

Indian female royalty
Indian queen consorts
Year of birth missing
16th-century Indian women
16th-century Indian people
1562 deaths
Indian princesses 
Rajput princesses